Gavin Turek is a singer, songwriter, dancer, and actress from Los Angeles, California.

Life and career
Gavin released her first solo EP titled “Good Look for You” via her own label Madame Gold Records. The EP garnered attention and praise from Stereogum, Nylon, Okayplayer, NPR, KCRW, and Billboard, all of which highlighted her undeniable songwriting chops and vertiginous sound - a dovetailing, harmonious union of retro and modern elements. She followed up with a string of captivating singles, including pop favorite "WHITNEY" and funk anthem “2AM,” which was paired with a stunning visual produced by Lena Waithe. Her music was subsequently stitched into the fabric of Netflix’s Dear White People and HBO’s High Maintenance, and she has since appeared as a musical guest on Conan and on-tour in Japan, UK, China, France and across the states supporting artists like Hayley Kiyoko, Tokimonsta and Tuxedo.  

Her debut album Madame Gold, produced by Childish Gambino collaborator Chris Hartz, dropped summer 2021 on Madame Gold Records. After a tenuous, challenging writing process in 2019 that left her questioning her artistry and the project at large, Gavin took a step back to reevaluate the intentions for the material. She responded with a newfound vigor and commitment to round out the story she wanted to tell; a story “of a woman in flux, vulnerable and full of fear who found the courage to get back up and fight, ultimately saving herself.” Madame Gold received high praise from outlets like Paper Magazine, Stereo Gum, The Cut, KCRW etc.

References

https://www.papermag.com/gavin-turek-hero-madame-gold-2653908926.html

https://www.kcrw.com/news/shows/press-play-with-madeleine-brand/afghanistan-scotus-music/gavin-turek-madame-gold

External links

 Official website

Living people
American women singers
American actresses
Year of birth missing (living people)
21st-century American women